Who Can You Trust? is the debut studio album by English electronic music group Morcheeba. It was released in 1996 on China Records in the United Kingdom and Discovery and Sire Records in the United States.  Stylistically, the album is by far the band's most trip hop oriented release, consisting of languid, looping grooves, using mostly Rhodes piano, electric guitar and scratching. At the end of 1998 the album was re-issued as 2-CDs with the 8 track disc Beats & B-Sides collection.

Reception

Melody Maker recommended Who Can You Trust? and remarked that Morcheeba "take up where trip hop leaves off, picking up at its outer reaches and taking it way, way off into the Indian Ocean... A strange and bitter brew indeed." Musician wrote that the band is "saved from Portishead comparisons mainly by their fondness for guitars" and that their "laid-back beats and gentle, smoky tunes are enhanced by Ry Cooder-ish slide, funky wah-wah, and other simple guitar flourishes, as well as a reappearing Hammond organ and some occasional strings." Josef Woodard of Entertainment Weekly compared vocalist Skye Edwards to "Sade filtered through Portishead" and felt that she has "enough hypnotic charms and charisma to counter the dangers of techno-riff overkill." Robert Christgau, in The Village Voice, praised the band as "always thoughtful, often sad, rarely neurotic, never scary."

Commercial performance
By 1998, Who Can You Trust? had sold around 500,000 copies worldwide, and by 2003 it had passed the one million mark in worldwide sales. By 2000, combined sales of Who Can You Trust? and the group's second album Big Calm stood at 315,000 copies in the United States.

Track listing

Certifications

References

1996 debut albums
China Records albums
Discovery Records albums
Morcheeba albums